Braemia vittata is a species of orchid and the only species of genus Braemia. It is found in Colombia, Ecuador, Peru, Venezuela, Brazil, Suriname, Guyana, and French Guiana.

References

External links 
IOSPE orchid photos Braemia vittata

Monotypic Epidendroideae genera
Stanhopeinae
Orchids of Venezuela
Orchids of Brazil
Orchids of Colombia
Orchids of Ecuador
Orchids of Peru
Orchids of Suriname
Orchids of Guyana
Orchids of French Guiana
Stanhopeinae genera